..Cuz a D.U. Party Don't Stop! is the sixth and final studio album released by the rap group Digital Underground. The album was released on May 20, 2008, ten years after the group's fifth studio effort, Who Got the Gravy?, and two months after the group disbanded.

Track listing

References

2008 albums
Digital Underground albums
Jake Records albums